The Other Woman is a 2014 American romantic comedy film directed by Nick Cassavetes, written by Melissa Stack, and starring Cameron Diaz, Leslie Mann, Kate Upton, Nikolaj Coster-Waldau, Nicki Minaj, Taylor Kinney, and Don Johnson. The film follows three womenCarly (Diaz), Kate (Mann), and Amber (Upton)who are all romantically involved with the same man (Coster-Waldau). After finding out about each other, the trio take their revenge on him.

Development of The Other Woman began in January 2012, when 20th Century Fox hired Stack to write the script, based on the original idea from 1996 comedy The First Wives Club. Casting was done between November 2012 and June 2013. Filming began on April 29, 2013, in locations including Manhattan, Long Island, the Hamptons, Dockers Waterside Restaurant on Dune Road in Quogue, and the Bahamas, and it concluded on August 27 that year. Aaron Zigman composed the score and LBI Productions produced the film. The film was released on April 25, 2014, in the United States, and distributed worldwide by 20th Century Fox. The film received mostly negative reviews from critics, but was a box office success, grossing $196.7 million worldwide.

Plot
Carly Whitten (Cameron Diaz), a New York attorney, is dating handsome and charismatic businessman Mark King (Nikolaj Coster-Waldau), with whom she has been having sex for two months. Carly plans to introduce Mark to her father Frank (Don Johnson) over dinner, only for Mark to cancel on them and go out of town because of a "flood" at his Connecticut home. Encouraged by Frank, Carly dresses up in a sexy plumber's outfit and heads to Mark's house to seduce him. However, she is horrified to be met at the door by Mark's wife Kate (Leslie Mann), whom she had assumed to be Mark's housekeeper. Thrown for a loop by this revelation, Carly flees in embarrassment and shock.

The next day, Kate shows up at Carly's law firm, having found her contact details in Mark's phone book. Carly admits to a panicked Kate that Mark has been cheating on her, but assures her she had no idea Mark was married. Initially annoyed by her constant presence at her apartment or work, Carly begins to warm up to Kate after a wild sleepover and a boozy heart-to-heart. Kate discovers that Mark is seeing yet another woman, who she thinks is Carly secretly continuing her previous relationship with Mark. Confronting Carly about this, they argue before realizing that Mark is seeing a third woman as both Carly and Kate have been refusing sex with him.

Carly and Kate follow Mark to the Hamptons, where they stay at the house of Kate's brother Phil (Taylor Kinney), who is immediately attracted to Carly. The duo spies on Mark and find him with his mistress Amber (Kate Upton), a beautiful swimsuit supermodel, on the beach. When Mark leaves for the gym, they inform Amber that Mark has been cheating on all of them. All three women decide to get revenge on him together. Kate spikes his smoothies with estrogen pills to swell his nipples, has their dog licking his toothbrush before soaking it in their toilet, and adds hair-removal cream to his shampoo. Carly spikes his water with a laxative to give him heavy diarrhea. Amber uses an ugly drag queen sexual partner against him.

While carrying out the various pranks, they discover Mark has been embezzling money from various startup companies his workplace helps to develop. Meanwhile, Carly begins to connect romantically and feel a bond with Phil. The women's camaraderie begins to fall apart when Kate finds herself still in love with Mark after caving in and having sex with him. Carly exposes Mark's fraud before texting him, upsetting Kate and Amber. Later, Mark goes to the Bahamas on a supposed business trip and Kate decides to follow and expose him. When she arrives she is surprised to find Carly and Amber waiting for her. They explain that Mark has set up Kate as the owner of the companies he defrauded, which, if his fraud is discovered, would result in Kate going to prison rather than him. She also finds out he has been seeing yet another woman, someone he has met on this trip. This, and the possibility of facing prison, motivates her to take action, with the help of Carly's legal expertise. Amber confides to Carly that she is seeing someone else too.

When Mark returns from the trip, he visits Carly at her office. He is locked in a conference room by her assistant and friend Lydia (Nicki Minaj) and is stunned to see his wife, his girlfriend, and his summer fling sitting there all together. They proceed to confront him with his infidelities and embezzlement. With Carly as her attorney, Kate presents divorce papers and a list of their assets. She reveals how she, named CEO by Mark, has returned all of his embezzled money to the companies from which he stole it, saving them both from jail time as well as bankrupting Mark, much to his shock and hysterical outrage. Mark's business partner Nick (David Thornton) then fires him and acknowledges Kate's work. Everyone watches in amusement as a furious Mark accidentally smashes into an empty room's glass paneling, drastically hurting his nose and ripping his coat, and exits to find his car being towed for being near the red zone before receiving a departing punch in the face from Frank as payback. Some time later, Carly, Kate, and Amber happily toast to their friendship, promising to never sleep with the same man ever again.

In the postscript, Carly and Phil move in together and Carly becomes pregnant with Phil's child. Kate takes over Mark's job with Nick and becomes CEO of several successful companies, making big profits under her honest leadership. Frank is revealed as the man Amber is dating and the two travel the world together.

Cast
 Leslie Mann as Kate Hampton, a business-educated housewife in Connecticut who discovers that her husband Mark is cheating on her with two women
 Cameron Diaz as Carly Whitten, an attorney in New York City who finds out that her boyfriend Mark is already married and has another girlfriend
 Kate Upton as Amber, an Amazon swimsuit supermodel living in The Hamptons and Mark's second girlfriend who believes that Mark is in the process of divorcing his wife
 Nikolaj Coster-Waldau as Mark King, a wealthy businessman who is cheating by sleeping with his wife Kate and two girlfriends, Carly and Amber, at the same time
 Taylor Kinney as Phil Hampton, Kate's younger brother who becomes romantically involved with Carly
 Nicki Minaj as Lydia, Carly's confidante and assistant
 Don Johnson as Frank Whitten, Carly's father who dates women half his age
 David Thornton as Nick, Mark's earlier business partner
 Victor Cruz as Fernando, a limousine driver Carly hired
 Olivia Culpo as Raven-Haired Beauty, one of Mark's conquests in the Caribbean
 Radio Man (Craig Castaldo) as himself

Production

Development
On January 16, 2012, it was announced that 2007 Black Listed screenwriter Melissa Stack was hired by 20th Century Fox to write an untitled female revenge comedy, which Julie Yorn would produce through LBI Productions. The film's script was described as the original idea from the 1996 film The First Wives Club, but with younger leads. The film's title was revealed to be The Other Woman on November 13. In January of the following year, Nick Cassavetes signed on to direct the film.

Casting
In November 2012, Cameron Diaz was in talks for the lead role. Diaz's representative also revealed that actress Kristen Wiig was under consideration for the wife role. In March 2013, Leslie Mann and Nikolaj Coster-Waldau  were in talks to join the film, and Diaz was confirmed for her role. The following month, Kate Upton, Taylor Kinney, and Nicki Minaj, in her feature film debut, joined the film. Don Johnson was cast in June as Diaz's character's father.

Filming

In March 2013, the shooting was set to begin late-spring or early summer 2013 in New York City. Later it was told that the production would begin in May 2013. Principal photography  began on April 29, 2013, and filming was completed by August 27, 2013. Much of the filming took place in parts of New York, including Long Island, The Hamptons, and Westhampton Beach. From July 18 to 23, filming took place in New Providence, where Nassau, The Bahamas, was used as the filming location. The Atlantis Paradise Island was also used as the shooting location. Isola Trattoria and Crudo Bar at Mondrian Hotel in SoHo, Manhattan, was used for the scene in which the women meet for a celebration toast at the end of the film.

Music
The Other Womans music was composed by Aaron Zigman, who was reportedly set to score the film on May 31, 2013. The film featured songs from various artists including Etta James, Ester Dean, Morcheeba, Cyndi Lauper, Britt Nicole, Patty Griffin, Lorde, Keyshia Cole and Iggy Azalea.

Release
On March 31, 2014, the film had a world premiere in Amsterdam; the next day, on April 1, it had a UK premiere at the Curzon Mayfair Cinema in London. The film later had a US premiere on April 21 in Westwood, California.

On March 25, 2014, Fox appealed the R-rating, which Motion Picture Association of America gave the film for sexual references. The studio wanted a PG-13 rating. On April 9, the MPAA's rating appeals board took back the R and gave the film a PG-13; the sources confirmed that there were no changes made to get the film PG-13. The Other Woman was released on April 25 in the United States.

Box office
The Other Woman opened at number 1 in North America on April 25, 2014, in 3,205 theaters debuting atop the weekend box office with earnings of $24.7 million across the three days. The film grossed $83.9 million in the United States and Canada and $112.8 million in other territories for a total worldwide gross of $196.7 million, against a production budget of $40 million.

Home media
The Other Woman was released on DVD and Blu-ray on July 29, 2014. The Blu-ray edition features a gag reel, giggle fits, a gallery and deleted scenes. In the United States, the film has grossed $9,592,336 from DVD sales and $4,163,463 from Blu-ray sales, making a total of $13,755,799.

Reception

Critical response
, The Other Woman holds a 25% approval rating on Rotten Tomatoes, based on 164 reviews with an average rating of 4.24/10. The site's critical consensus reads, "The Other Woman definitely boasts a talented pedigree, but all that skill is never fully brought to bear on a story that settles for cheap laughs instead of reaching its empowering potential." On Metacritic, the film has a score of 39 out of 100 based on reviews from 35 critics, indicating "generally unfavorable reviews". Audiences polled by CinemaScore gave the film an average grade of "B+" on an A+ to F scale.

Justin Chang of Variety said, "Beneath the wobbly pratfalls and the scatological setpieces, there's no denying the film's mean-spirited kick, or its more-than-passing interest in what makes its women tick." The Hollywood Reporter's critic Todd McCarthy said: "It would have helped if director Nick Cassavetes had something resembling a sure hand at comedy." Ignatiy Vishnevetsky of The A.V. Club gave the film grade C−, saying "All of a sudden, a spotted Great Dane squats in the middle of a Manhattan apartment and out plop several gleaming, glistening CGI turds. It's one of those cases where a Hollywood movie inadvertently summarizes itself in a single shot." Michael Phillips of Chicago Tribune gave the film two and a half stars out of four, saying "Line to line, it's fresher than any number of guy-centric "Hangover"-spawned affairs, despite director Cassavetes' lack of flair for slapstick." The Boston Globe's Ty Burr gave the film one out of four stars and said, "It's 'The First Wives Club' rewritten for younger, less demanding audiences, or a '9 to 5' with absolutely nothing at stake." Stephanie Zacharek of The Village Voice said, "The Other Woman doesn't give these actresses much to do except look ridiculous, if not sneaky and conniving."

Michael Sragow of Orange County Register gave the film grade C, saying that the film is "a coarse, rickety comedy." Richard Corliss wrote for Time magazine that "All three women are less watchable and amusing than Nicki Minaj as Carly's legal assistant Lydia." Film critic Stephen Holden of The New York Times said that the film is "so dumb, lazy, clumsily assembled and unoriginal, it could crush any actor forced to execute its leaden slapstick gags and mouth its crude, humorless dialogue." James Berardinelli of ReelViews wondered, "Has it come to this for director Nick Cassavetes?", comparing his career negatively to that of his father, John Cassavetes. Berardinelli elaborated, "what a comedown to find him in charge of such an unfocused, unfunny, scatologically-obsessed 'comedy.'" Christy Lemire of RogerEbert.Com gave the film two out of four stars and said, "While "The Other Woman" raises some thoughtful questions about independence, identity and the importance of sisterhood, ultimately it would rather poop on them and then throw them through a window in hopes of the getting the big laugh." Wesley Morris of Grantland said, "No one knows which takes are funny and which aren't. More than once, all three women, especially poor Upton, are caught looking like they don't know what they're doing."

Bilge Ebiri of the magazine New York said, "You can't shake the feeling that in a just world, all these women – even Kate Upton – would have better material than this." Connie Ogle of The Miami Herald gave the film three out of four stars and called the film a "goofy, ridiculous, with more gross-out humor than is strictly necessary but still funny. It falls into the category of Girlfriend Films – as in, go with your girlfriends and leave your date/partner/spouse at home with the PlayStation or the NBA playoffs." Colin Covert of Star Tribune gave the film three out of four stars, saying "It's an escapist women's empowerment comedy like many others, but elevated by the simple virtue of being, for most of its length, very, very funny." Ann Hornaday of The Washington Post gave the film one and a half stars out of four, saying "A movie as generic and forgettable as the sofa-size art on its characters' walls." Linda Holmes wrote for NPR, calling the film "a conceptually odious, stupid-to-the-bone enterprise ..." Betsy Sharkey of the Los Angeles Times advised guys to "Step away from the vehicle, because The Other Woman is out of control and intent on running down a certain kind of male."

Accolades

References

External links
 
 
 
 
 
 

2014 films
2014 romantic comedy films
2010s buddy comedy films
2010s English-language films
2010s female buddy films
2010s feminist films
20th Century Fox films
American buddy comedy films
American female buddy films
American feminist comedy films
American films about revenge
American romantic comedy films
Films about adultery in the United States
Films about fraud
Films directed by Nick Cassavetes
Films scored by Aaron Zigman
Films set in the Bahamas
Films set in Connecticut
Films set in Manhattan
Films set in New York City
Golden Raspberry Award winning films
2010s American films